is a waterfall in  Hinoemata, Fukushima Prefecture, Japan, on the Tadami River in Oze National Park. It is one of "Japan’s Top 100 Waterfalls", in a listing published by the Japanese Ministry of the Environment in 1990.

Notes

Waterfalls of Japan
Landforms of Fukushima Prefecture
Tourist attractions in Fukushima Prefecture